The Congo moor chat or Congo moor-chat (Myrmecocichla tholloni) is a species of bird in the family Muscicapidae.

Range
It is found in Angola, Central African Republic, Republic of the Congo, Democratic Republic of the Congo, and Gabon. Its natural habitats are subtropical or tropical dry lowland grassland and subtropical or tropical seasonally wet or flooded lowland grassland.

References

Congo moor chat
Birds of Central Africa
Congo moor chat
Taxonomy articles created by Polbot